Baghdadi or Al-Baghdadi may refer to:

People
Al-Baghdadi or Baghdadi is an Arabic nisba meaning "from Baghdad". It is usually added at the end of names as a specifier.
People with the name:

Medieval
Ibn Sa'd (784–845), Ibn Sa'd al-Baghdadi
Junayd Baghdadi (830–910), one of the great early mystics, or Sufis, of Islam
Abu Mansur al-Baghdadi, (980–1037) mathematician and heresiologist
Al-Khatib al-Baghdadi (1002–1071), Shafi'i scholar
Muhammad al-Baghdadi (1050-1141), jurist and mathematician, author of a commentary on the tenth book of Euclid's Elements popular in medieval Europe in translation
Hibat Allah Abu'l-Barakat al-Baghdaadi (1080–1164/1165), physicist and philosopher
Abd al-Latif al-Baghdadi (1162–1231), Muwaffaq al-Din `Abd al-Latif al-Baghdadi, physician who wrote al-Mujarrad li lughat al-hadith
Muhammad bin Hasan al-Baghdadi (died 1239), author of an early Arab cookbook

Modern
Khâlid-i Baghdâdî or Mevlana Halid-i Bagdadi (1779–1827), Iraqi Kurdish Sufi
Mahmud al-Alusi al-Baghdadi (1802–1854), Iraqi Islamic scholar
Abdel Latif Boghdadi (politician) (1917–1999), Egyptian military and political figure
Ali Mustafa Baghdady (1922–2005), Egyptian Air Force commander
Baghdadi Mahmudi (born 1946), prime minister of Libya 2006–2011
Maroun Bagdadi (1950–1993), Lebanese film director
Abu Omar al-Baghdadi (1959–2010), leader of the Islamic State of Iraq 2006–2010
Abu Bakr al-Baghdadi (1971–2019), leader of the Islamic State of Iraq and the Levant 2010–2019
Ali Ibrahim Jama (nicknamed Ali Baghdadi), governor of the Bank of Somaliland
 Iyad el-Baghdadi (1977-) Palestinian writer and  human rights activist 
Ali Hassani Baghdadi, Iraqi Shia Marja 
Mohammad Baghdadi (born 1996), German footballer
Sonia Baghdady, American news reader

Places
Baghdadi, Hormozgan, Iran
Baghdadi, Markazi, Iran
Baghdadi, South Khorasan, Iran
Baghdadi, Iraq
Baghdadi (Karachi), a neighborhood of Karachi, Sindh, Pakistan

Ethnic group
Baghdadi Jews, one of three types of Jews in South Asia

Arabic-language surnames
Nisbas